This is the list of national ski-jumping records.

List by country

Men

Women

References

national